Popliteal ligament may refer to:

 Arcuate popliteal ligament
 Oblique popliteal ligament